Live at the Knight is the first live album from John Mark McMillan. Jesus Culture Music alongside Sparrow Records released the album on October 23, 2015.

Critical reception

Awarding the album four and a half stars at Jesus Freak Hideout, Scott Fryberger states, "Live at the Knight is John Mark McMillan's first ever live album, and he, his band, and the sound crew all nailed it." Cal Moore, giving the album five stars from The Christian Manifesto, writes, "Live at The Knight certainly fits in the 'best of' category." Rating the album four stars for New Release Today, Mary Nikkel describes, "If a lot of contemporary worship has begun to feel dry and sterile, this rowdy, passionate set of live songs might be exactly the refreshment you need." Indicating in a ten out of ten review by Cross Rhythms, Stephen Curry says, "this whole live experience is masterfully executed from one of the Church's finest artists."

Track listing

Chart performance

References

2015 live albums
John Mark McMillan albums
Sparrow Records live albums